Hemeroblemma opigena is a species of moth in the family Erebidae first described by Dru Drury in 1773. The species is found from Florida to Brazil.

The wingspan is about 80 mm for the females. In Florida, adults are on wing in March.

References

External links

"Hemeroblemma opigena (Drury, 1773)". Catalogue of the Lepidoptera of the French Antilles. Retrieved December 17, 2019.

Thermesiini